Quito-Arma District is one of sixteen districts of the province Huaytará in Peru.

See also 
 Wiraqucha Pirqa

References